The 2012–13 Russian Second Division  was the third strongest division in Russian football. The Second Division is geographically divided into 5 zones.
The winners of each zone are automatically promoted into the First Division. The bottom finishers of each zone lose professional status and are relegated into the Amateur Football League.

West

Standings

Top scorers
Source: rfspro.ru 
11 goals
Aleksei Zhdanov (Khimik)
10 goals
Konstantin Podkorytov (Tekstilshchik)
Mukhammad Sultonov (Lokomotiv-2)
8 goals
Anton Shishayev (Pskov-747)
Artyom Sivayev (Dnepr)
Aleksandr Yevstafyev (Rus)

Center

Standings

Top scorers
Source: rfspro.ru 
16 goals
Aleksandr Kutyin (Arsenal)
13 goals
Rinat Timokhin (Arsenal)
12 goals
Aleksei Antonnikov (Zenit)
Aleksei Averyanov (Podolye)
11 goals
Sergei Anokhin (Kaluga)
Maksim Protserov (Metallurg Vyksa)
Yevgeny Savin (Arsenal)
10 goals
Karen Sargsyan (Sokol / Kaluga)
Dmitri Sokolov (Sokol)

South

Standings

Top scorers
Source: rfspro.ru 
16 goals
Yuri Pugachyov (Astrakhan)
15 goals
Magomed Guguyev (Angusht)
Sergei Verkashanskiy (Torpedo)
12 goals
Vyacheslav Bokov (MITOS)
Anatoly Shevchenko (Torpedo / Chernomorets)
11 goals
Sergei Sechin (Astrakhan)
10 goals
Sergei Sinyayev (Astrakhan)

Ural-Povolzhye

Standings

Top scorers
Source: rfspro.ru 
14 goals
Dmitri Zarva (Chelyabinsk)
10 goals
Sergei Dzodziyev (Lada-Togliatti)
9 goals
Maksim Barsov (Volga)
Vasili Panev (Zenit-Izhevsk)
8 goals
Ruslan Galiakberov (Rubin-2)
Sergei Serdyukov (Gazovik)
7 goals
Vladislav Aksyutenko (Gazovik)
Anton Kilin (Chelyabinsk)
Khasan Mamtov (Tyumen)
Sergei Titov (Spartak Yoshkar-Ola)

East

Standings

Top scorers
Source: rfspro.ru 
14 goals
Andrei Polyanskiy (Dynamo)
Aleksandr Tikhonovetsky (Luch-Energiya)
12 goals
Anton Bagayev (Irtysh)
Yevgeni Dudikov (Baikal)
11 goals
Pavel Garannikov (Chita)
9 goals
Stanislav Goncharov (Smena)
8 goals
Aleksei Buznyakov (Amur-2010)
Marat Sagirov (Luch-Energiya)

References

External links
Official site 

Russian Second League seasons
3
Russia